Deko Barbara-Jessica Wedi (born September 13, 1992), professionally known as Rouge, is a South African rapper, author, and television presenter. Her debut album The New Era Sessions, accompanied by a short film, received a South African Film and Television Award for Best Micro Budget Film.

Early life
Deko Barbara-Jessica Wedi was born on September 13, 1992, in Pretoria, Gauteng. She is of DR Congolese descent as both her parents were born in Congo. She started songwriting at the age of 12, which resulted in her taking part in acting, public speaking and poetry. She started rapping at the age of 19, when her friend suggested she should rap to her own R&B songs she composed. She attended the University of Pretoria, where she completed her degree in Drama & Film.

Career

2014–2016: Beginnings
In December 2014, Rouge released her second single "Mi Corazon" featuring rapper BigStar Johnson, following her debut single, "Party". The following year, rapper AKA featured Rouge alongside other female rappers in the remix of his song "Baddest". As for 2016, Rouge then released the song "Mbongo Zaka" featuring Moozlie. The song gained her prominence as it was her first song to top charts on all major radio stations across South Africa.

Rouge was listed as one of six best female rappers in Africa by hip hop website Creative-hiphop in 2017, alongside fellow South African Nadia Nakai and Ghanaian rapper Eno Barony.

In October 2016, Rouge was one of the mentors on the Vuzu reality game show The Coalition, which involves interns undergoing challenges with the assistance of the mentors. She also participated on the MTV Base Cyphers in the "New Skool" (2017).

2017–present: The New Era Sessions
The New Era Sessions was released on September 8, 2017, which debuted no. 2 on the local iTunes charts. On September 15, 2017, she premiered the short film for the album as a video anthology and drama. The short film aired on MTV Base starring Atandwa Kani, Fikile Kani, Denise Zimba and herself. She released 5 singles from the album, including "Mbongo Zaka" and "Dololo". The visual album won several accolades, including a South African Film and Television Award for Best Micro Budget Film Award, and a South African Music Award for Best Music Video of the Year.

In 2018, Rouge was the presenter for SABC 1 music show Remix SA. She is also one of the deciders of candy company Halls SA's hashtag competition HallsOMFCC. On March 14, 2019, Rouge announced signing with Sony Music South Africa.

Awards and nominations

Discography

 The New Era Sessions (2017)

Tracklist 

Single Release

References 

1992 births
Living people
Rappers from Pretoria, South Africa
South African hip hop musicians
South African women rappers